Bill Roper may refer to:

 Bill Roper (American football) (1880–1933), American football player and coach
 Bill Roper (filker) (born 1956), science fiction fan/filker
 Bill Roper (video game producer) (born 1965), computer game producer

See also
 William Roper, biographer
Willy Roper